Dacryodes is a genus of about 60 species of trees in the family Burseraceae. The generic name is from the Greek  meaning "tear(drop)", referring to how resin droplets form on the bark surface.

Description
Dacryodes species grow as shrubs to medium-sized trees. Their bark is smooth to scaly with pale sapwood. Flowers are unisexual. The fruits feature a fleshy and thick pericarp. The fruit of D. rostrata is considered edible in Borneo.

Distribution and habitat
Dacryodes species grow naturally in tropical forests of: America, Africa and Asia. The habitats range from lowland to submontane forests from sea-level to  altitude.

Species
 The Plant List recognises 63 accepted species (including infraspecific names):

 Dacryodes acutipyrena  
 Dacryodes bampsiana  
 Dacryodes belemensis  
 Dacryodes breviracemosa  
 Dacryodes buettneri  
 Dacryodes camerunensis  
 Dacryodes chimantensis  
 Dacryodes colombiana  
 Dacryodes costanensis  
 Dacryodes costata  
 Dacryodes crassipes  
 Dacryodes cupularis  
 Dacryodes cuspidata  
 Dacryodes dungii  
 Dacryodes ebatom  
 Dacryodes edilsonii  
 Dacryodes edulis  
 Dacryodes elmeri  
 Dacryodes excelsa  
 Dacryodes expansa  
 Dacryodes glabra  
 Dacryodes granatensis  
 Dacryodes heterotricha  
 Dacryodes hopkinsii  
 Dacryodes igaganga  
 Dacryodes incurvata  
 Dacryodes kingii  
 Dacryodes klaineana  
 Dacryodes kostermansii  
 Dacryodes kukachkana  
 Dacryodes laxa  
 Dacryodes le-testui  
 Dacryodes ledermannii  
 Dacryodes leonardiana  
 Dacryodes longifolia  
 Dacryodes macrocarpa  
 Dacryodes macrophylla  
 Dacryodes microcarpa  
 Dacryodes multijuga  
 Dacryodes negrensis  
 Dacryodes nervosa  
 Dacryodes nitens  
 Dacryodes normandii  
 Dacryodes occidentalis  
 Dacryodes olivifera  
 Dacryodes osika  
 Dacryodes papuana  
 Dacryodes paraensis  
 Dacryodes patentinervia  
 Dacryodes peruviana  
 Dacryodes puberula  
 Dacryodes pubescens  
 Dacryodes roraimensis  
 Dacryodes rostrata  
 Dacryodes rubiginosa  
 Dacryodes rugosa  
 var. virgata  
 Dacryodes sclerophylla  
 Dacryodes steyermarkii  
 Dacryodes tessmannii  
 Dacryodes trapnellii  
 Dacryodes trinitensis  
 Dacryodes villiersiana

References

External links

 
Burseraceae genera
Taxa named by Martin Vahl